Servando Nicolás Villamil (11 April 1965 – 11 September 2021) was an Argentinian professional footballer who played for clubs in Argentina, Chile and Ecuador. He is considered an idol at the Chilean team Deportes Concepción.

Club career
On 19 November 1991, and playing for Concepción, he saved a penalty while on his back to Unión Española at Santa Laura Stadium.

Health issues and death
Villamil was known to suffer from depression and diabetes.

In 2016, he was featured in a regarded chapter of «En Su Propia Trampa», program of the channel Canal 13.

On 24 March 2017, his left leg had to be amputated due to complications from his diabetes.

On 11 September 2021, it was reported that Villamil had died from a heart attack. Among the referents which mourned the death of Villamil was Patricio Almendra, who declared to have known his suffering closely, noting the following:

References

External links
 
 Nicolás Villamil at playmakerstats.com (English version of ceroacero.es)
 Profile at En una Baldosa 

1965 births
2021 deaths
Sportspeople from Mendoza, Argentina
Argentine footballers
Argentine expatriate footballers
Racing Club de Avellaneda footballers
Gimnasia y Esgrima de Mendoza footballers
C.D. Arturo Fernández Vial footballers
Deportes Concepción (Chile) footballers
Everton de Viña del Mar footballers
Universidad de Chile footballers
Ñublense footballers
Chilean Primera División players
Primera B de Chile players
Expatriate footballers in Chile
Expatriate footballers in Ecuador
Argentine expatriate sportspeople in Chile
Argentine expatriate sportspeople in Ecuador
Association football goalkeepers
Argentine amputees
Association footballers with limb difference
Deaths from diabetes